Shap Rural is a civil parish in the Eden District, Cumbria, England.  It contains eleven listed buildings that are recorded in the National Heritage List for England.  All the listed buildings are designated at Grade II, the lowest of the three grades, which is applied to "buildings of national importance and special interest".  The parish is almost entirely rural, and the listed buildings consist of farm houses and farm buildings, three bridges, a lime kiln, and a monument.


Buildings

References

Citations

Sources

Lists of listed buildings in Cumbria
Shap Rural, list of